Lee Carpenter (born May 14, 1949) was a Canadian ice hockey defenceman who played in 211 games in the American Hockey League for the Tidewater Wings and Virginia Wings. Carpenter was drafted by the Detroit Red Wings in the 3rd round, 18th overall, of the 1966 NHL Amateur Draft.

See also
List of Detroit Red Wings draft picks

External links

1949 births
Living people
Detroit Red Wings draft picks
Hamilton Red Wings (OHA) players
Fort Worth Wings players
Virginia Wings players
Canadian ice hockey defencemen
Ice hockey people from Toronto